Rashid Bashir is Dean of The Grainger College of Engineering, Grainger Distinguished Chair in Engineering and Professor of Bioengineering, at the University of Illinois at Urbana-Champaign. He was the Executive Associate Dean and Chief Diversity Officer at the Carle-Illinois College of Medicine (07/2017 – 12/2018) at UIUC. Previously, he was the Abel Bliss Professor of Engineering, Head of Department of Bioengineering (07/2013 – 06/2017), Director of the Micro and Nanotechnology Laboratory (a campus-wide clean room research facility) (10/2007 – 06/2013), and Co-Director of the campus-wide Center for Nanoscale Science and Technology (10/2010 – 06/2013), a "collaboratory" aimed at facilitating center grants and large initiatives around campus in the area of nanotechnology. Prior to joining UIUC, he was at Purdue University from 1998–2007 with faculty appointments in Electrical and Computer Engineering, and Bioengineering. From 1992 to 1998 he worked at National Semiconductor Corporation in Santa Clara, CA as Sr. Engineering Manager. He graduated with a PhD in Electrical Engineering from Purdue University in 1992. He has authored or co-authored over 240 journal papers, over 200 conference papers and conference abstracts, and over 120 invited talks, and has been granted 50 patents. He is an NSF Faculty Early Career Award winner and the 2012 IEEE EMBS Technical Achievement Award. He received the Pritzker Lecture Award from BMES in 2018. He is a fellow of IEEE, AIMBE, AAAS, BMES, RSC, APS, and NAI.

His research interests include bionanotechnology, BioMEMS, lab on a chip, interfacing of biology and engineering from the molecular to the tissue scale, and applications of semiconductor fabrication to biomedical engineering, all applied to solving biomedical problems such as cancer and infectious disease diagnostics.

He was part of the founding team that led the conception of and was co-chair of the curriculum committee for the Carle Illinois College of Medicine, the world’s first engineering based College of Medicine at the University of Illinois at Urbana-Campaign. In addition to leading  his own research group, he was the PI on an NSF IGERT on Cellular and Molecular Mechanics and Bionanotechnology and was PI on an NIH Training Grant on Cancer Nanotechnology. He is co-PI on a recently funded National Research Traineeship (NRT) from NSF. He is also Associate Director and UIUC lead on an NSF Science and Technology Center on Emergent Behavior of Integrated Cellular Systems (with MIT, GT, and other partners).

Career summary
Rashid Bashir finished his BSEE in Dec. 1987 from Texas Tech University, his MSEE from Purdue University in 1989, and his Ph.D. from Purdue in 1992. From Oct. 1992 to Oct. 1998, he worked at National Semiconductor Corporation in the Analog/Mixed Signal Process Technology Development Group. where he was promoted to Sr. Engineering Manager. He joined Purdue  in Oct. 1998 as an Assistant Professor and was later promoted to Professor of Electrical and Computer Engineering and a Courtesy Professor of Biomedical Engineering and Mechanical Engineering. He was a visiting Scientist at Massachusetts General Hospital, Cambridge, MA & Research Fellow, Shriner's Hospital for Children, Cambridge, MA from 2006–2012. He was also Visiting Professor of Surgery at Harvard Medical School, Cambridge, MA, from 2006 to 2008. Since joining the University of Illinois at Urbana-Champaign in Oct. 2007, he was the Abel Bliss Professor of Electrical and Computer Engineering & Bioengineering, Director of the Micro and Nanotechnology Laboratory (a campus-wide clean room facility), and Co-Director of the campus-wide Center for Nanoscale Science and Technology, a "collaboratory" aimed at facilitating center grants and large initiatives around campus in the area of nanotechnology. From 2013 to 2017 he was the department head of Bioengineering at the University of Illinois at Urbana–Champaign. He is the Grainger Distinguished Chair in Bioengineering, and Dean of the Grainger College of Engineering at the University of Illinois at Urbana–Champaign.

Work in industry
Prior to embarking on a highly successful academic career, he spent six years at National Semiconductor Corporation where he and his group developed and deployed three semiconductor analog process technologies (VIP3, VIP3H, and VIP4H) into manufacturing, and laid the foundations of two other RF BiCMOS technologies. His impactful contributions were acknowledged by multiple patents and achievement awards at National Semiconductor Corporation.

Academia and research
Prof. Bashir and his group has made pioneering contributions in the application of micro and nanotechnologies to biology and medicine. His most significant contributions have been in the development of electrically based biochip sensors, development of micro-mechanical sensors for biological detection, and development of 3D printing technologies for soft and biological materials. His work has had wide spread impact on utilization of BioMEMS technologies for diagnostic applications and micro-scale mechanical technologies for cellular characterization. He has had over 190 journal publications, over 200 conference presentations, posters, and abstracts, 37 patents, and over 115 invited talks.

Specifically, his group is credited with the following accomplishments;

(i) Prof. Bashir and his group has developed microscale devices with integrated dielectrophoretic filters for capture of bacteria and label free electrical sensing methods for subsequent detection of bacterial growth. These approaches can have important implications in clinical and pharmaceutical applications where determination of live and dead bacteria is the rate limiting step, and have significant applications in food safety and water testing (technology licensed to BioVitesse, Inc.). His group has developed a new lysate based impedance spectroscopy method where captured cells are lysed and the lysate is characterized electrically to determine the captured cell count. This method is more sensitive than ELISA but not requiring any labeling steps which are needed for ELISA. The work is the basis of a startup (Daktari, Inc.) and is being applied to detection of CD4+ white blood cells for the global health and detection of AIDS/HIV infection. Since then Prof. Bashir has improved the technique to perform counting of multiple cell types in microfluidic biochips from a drop of blood, and licensed to Prenosis, Inc. aiming to developing point of care cell counters. Also, his group contributed significantly to development of nanopore sensors for electrical detection of DNA molecules. They developed functionalized nanopore sensors to show selective detection of ssDNA molecules, and stacked graphene-dielectric nanopore sensors for detection of DNA and DNA-protein complexes.

(ii) Prof. Bashir has also made pioneering contributions towards development of micro-mechanical sensors for biological applications. His group first demonstrated the development of nanometer scale thick cantilevers for detection of viruses and also demonstrated that attachment of proteins on these structures can affect their stiffness, which can affect their resonant frequencies. These studies also revealed fundamental insight into the adsorption of proteins on these structures is function of the area of the sensors, and these findings have significant impact on the design of nanoscale mechanical sensors. He extended this work to study physical properties of mammalian cell such their mass and stiffness. His group most recently developed micromechanical resonant mass sensors for the detection of cell mass versus time for single adherent cell mass and found that the cell growth rate increases with cell mass.

(iii) Most recently, Prof. Bashir's group has had a series of articles (many of them as journal covers) that use 3D stereolithography and printing of hydrogel and polymer structures for applications in tissue engineering and biological machines. They demonstrated the cells remain viable and that these can be used to generate new blood vessels in-vivo with precise spatial control. They have also recently demonstrated printing of mm scale biological robots driven by cardiac cells and skeletal muscle cells and showed controlled directional motion. Work was highlighted in Popular Mechanics, The New York Times, Popular Science, CNN, and many other news venues.

Research leadership
Prof. Bashir has demonstrated his leadership skills by assembling and leading large national grants. He was PI on NSF IGERT on Cellular and Molecular Mechanics and Bionanotechnology at UIUC and PI on NIH Training Grant on Cancer Nanotechnology at UIUC. He is Campus Lead on NSF Science and Technology Center on Emergent Behavior of Integrated Cellular Systems (headquartered at MIT, with partners at Georgia Tech and UIUC) and a Member of the Executive Committee of the NSF Nanoscale Science and Engineering Engineering at Ohio State University. He also served on the external advisory board of the NIH-funded BioMEMS Resource Center at Harvard/MGH and the NIH-funded Center for Cancer Nanotechnology Excellence at Stanford University. He is also co-thrust lead in a recently funded MERSEC at UIUC and Co-PI of an NSF Training Grant on Building Miniature Brain Machinery.

References

External links

1967 births
Living people
American people of Pakistani descent
21st-century American engineers
Krannert School of Management alumni
Texas Tech University alumni
University of Illinois Urbana-Champaign faculty
Purdue University faculty
Engineers from Karachi
Fellows of the American Association for the Advancement of Science
Fellows of the American Institute for Medical and Biological Engineering
Fellows of the American Physical Society
Fellows of the Biomedical Engineering Society
Fellows of the Royal Society of Chemistry
Fellow Members of the IEEE